Julia Akhsarbekovna Khadartseva is a Russian psychologist, entrepreneur, expert on television and radio. The leader in the system of the Method of Constellation in Russia. The world record holder for the longest psychological training lasting more than 26 hours.

Biography
She was born in Pyatigorsk, Stavropol Krai (Russia) on October 4, 1981.

Father — Khadartsev Akhsarbek Nikolaevich (1949 – 2009), was born in Gusyra, North Ossetia (Russia). Worked as a builder.

Mother — Vasilyeva Olga Arkadyevna (born 1952) in Ganja (Azerbaijan). She worked as an engineer.

From 1981 to 1996, Julia Khadartseva lived in Vladikavkaz (Russia).

From August 1996 to July 1998, she lived in Krasnodar, where she graduated from school in 1999.
After school, Julia entered the Krasnodar College of Commerce and Economics, from which she graduated in 2001. After moving to Moscow, she studied at the Plekhanov Russian University of Economics and the Moscow Institute of Psychoanalysis, where she received her education as a psychologist.

Then she studied at the Moscow Pedagogical State University.

Since 2011, Julia has been conducting psychological consultations in the format of Constellation, trainings, placement marathons and transformational games.

Work and creativity
Julia Khadartseva has developed the author's method of arrangement, which is based on 6 levels: personal, parental, generic, karmic, universal, alien level.

Julia Khadartseva is the author of the book "About Money: All the Secrets of Wealth in One Book".
She is an expert on news sites and publications such as Komsomolskaya Pravda, "News.ru ", Moskovsky Komsomolets and others.

She is a regular expert on Channel One Russia, on MuzTV, RenTV, the Fifth Channel Russia and other Russian Federal channels.

Awards and prizes
September 5, 2021 – the world record for the Constellation method. The duration of the training is more than 26 hours. The official award was presented in Metropole, Moscow.

2022 – the award "Woman of the Year-2022", the nomination "The Constellator of 2022".

References

External links
 

Living people
Russian psychologists
1981 births